András Pályi (born 12 December 1943) is a Hungarian rower. He competed at the 1968 Summer Olympics and the 1972 Summer Olympics.

References

External links
 
 
 

1943 births
Living people
Hungarian male rowers
Olympic rowers of Hungary
Rowers at the 1968 Summer Olympics
Rowers at the 1972 Summer Olympics
Rowers from Budapest